Dupontiopsis is a monotypic genus of flowering plants belonging to the family Poaceae. The only species is Dupontiopsis hayachinensis.

Its native range is Japan.

References

Poaceae
Monotypic Poaceae genera